Lee Hyun-joo (born ) is a retired South Korean female volleyball player. She was part of the South Korea women's national volleyball team.

She participated in the 1994 FIVB Volleyball Women's World Championship. On club level she played with Ho.Nam Oil.

Clubs
 Ho.Nam Oil (1994)

References

1976 births
Living people
South Korean women's volleyball players
Place of birth missing (living people)